Ayodeji Balogun (born Ayodeji Olaleye Balogun in 1983) is a Nigerian entrepreneur, commodity trader and CEO, AFEX, Nigeria first private sector commodities exchange, and tech-enabled Agriculture Company. He is a Member, Board of Trustees of The Association of Security Exchange in Nigeria and serves on the board of Capital Market Development Fund.

Education 
Balogun was born in Ijebu-ode, Ogun state, Nigeria. He holds a diploma in Heavy Equipment Engineering from Penn Foster University, Scranton and (B.Eng.) in Mechanical Engineering from the Lagos State University. He furthered his education at Lagos Business School, where he earned an MBA and IESE Business School, Spain.

Career 
Balogun began his career as an analyst with Unilever Nigeria Plc and later became an associate at Doreo Partners where he contributed to the development of Nigeria’s Agriculture Transformation Plan in 2011. He was the Regional Director, Africa Exchange Holdings for West Africa and then became the Country Manager for AFEX Commodities Exchange Limited (AFEX) in July 2014. He was appointed CEO of AFEX in December 2019

Personal life 
Balogun is married to Oluwakemi Balogun, a medical doctor and together they have two children.

References 

1983 births
Living people
Nigerian technology businesspeople
21st-century Nigerian businesspeople
Nigerian company founders
Lagos Business School alumni